Irfan Ahmed (born 28 October 1994) is a Bangladeshi cricketer. He made his List A debut for Khelaghar Samaj Kallyan Samity in the 2017–18 Dhaka Premier Division Cricket League on 2 April 2018.

References

External links
 

1994 births
Living people
Bangladeshi cricketers
Khelaghar Samaj Kallyan Samity cricketers
People from Narayanganj District